Holderbank may refer to:

Two municipalities of Switzerland:
Holderbank, Aargau
Holderbank, Solothurn

The former name of the cement manufacturer Holcim